Hajji Dubin Abdulla İbrahim ulı (Tatar Cyrillic: Дубин Абдулла Ибраһим улы; , Dubin Abdulla Ibragimovich; born March 26, 1941) was a Tatar television and radio newsreader, and currently he is an ethnographer.

Born on March 26, 1941, in Astrakhan in a large family.

Dubin graduated the faculty of theatrics of the GITIS in Moscow. Later he moved to Kazan and was a top-level news reader of Tatar television and radio broadcasting from 1961 to 1981.

Abdulla Dubin is also known as a journalist and as a historical postcards collector. He published some of his collection in original booklets in color and black-and-white, devoted to Kazan, Astrakhan, Chistopol and Elabuga.

Dubin studies regional ethnography from 1968, fights for preservation of  tumbledown historical buildings in Kazan.

In 1990 he committed the Hajj.

References

Russian reporters and correspondents
Tatar people of Russia
1941 births
Living people
People from Astrakhan
Radio in the Soviet Union
20th-century Russian journalists
Deltiologists